Gerhardsen's Second Cabinet governed Norway between  5 November 1945 and 19 November 1951. The Labour Party (Ap) cabinet was led by Einar Gerhardsen.

In May 1948, Gerhardsen told Jens Chr Hauge, that he was considering resigning.
Furthermore, as candidates for prime minister, Gerhardsen named Torp, Sverre Støstad and Lars Evensen.

On 17 June 1948 parliament started its deliberations about the Helset Case. (Something Gerhardsen knew, but did not tell parliament, was that he had certain evidence that "either at the US embassy or in the top leadership of Norway's Armed Forces there were people who were willing to leak top secret info about then minister of defence's conversations with US military attaché, winter and spring 1948, in an attempt to force" the defence minister out of office—with or without the knowledge of Olaf Helset. Later in 1948 Olaf Helset resigned.

Cabinet members

|}

Notes

References

Gerhardsen 2
Gerhardsen 3
1945 establishments in Norway
1951 disestablishments in Norway
Cabinets established in 1945
Cabinets disestablished in 1951